Robert James Bromwich is a Judge of the Federal Court of Australia, serving since 29 February 2016. He also holds roles as an Additional Judge of the Supreme Court of the Australian Capital Territory (since 5 September 2016) and, from 10 April 2019 to 30 April 2020 was a part-time Commissioner of the Australian Law Reform Commission, sitting on its Inquiry on Corporate Crime.

Prior to being appointed as a judge in 2016, Bromwich was the Commonwealth Director of Public Prosecutions, holding that role from 2012 until 2016.

Biography
Bromwich was born in Darwin where his father was the Chief Surgeon. He moved to Canberra and then Sydney after his schooling and in 1984 completed a Bachelor of Economics and Bachelor of Laws from Macquarie University. He commenced legal work in 1985 as a lawyer in the Commonwealth Director of Public Prosecutions and later became an Assistant Director and trial advocate there. Bromwich's work at the CDPP covered a wide area of federal criminal law, but particularly focused on white-collar crime. He also assisted, while on secondment, in setting up the New South Wales Independent Commission Against Corruption, and obtained a Master of Laws from the University of Sydney in 1993.

In 1998 Bromwich moved to the private bar in New South Wales where he practised in public law, trade practices, industrial and federal criminal law. He was appointed Senior Counsel in 2009.

In December 2012, Bromwich was appointed by then-Attorney-General of Australia, Nicola Roxon as the Commonwealth Director of Public Prosecutions for a five-year term.

Bromwich undertook a number of structural reforms in the CDPP during his term as director, including moving the Office from a regional model to a practice group model with different leaders.

In February 2016, Attorney-General George Brandis appointed Bromwich to the Federal Court of Australia, and he was sworn in as a judge on 29 February 2016.

In April 2019, Attorney-General Christian Porter appointed Bromwich to the Australian Law Reform Commission to help with an ongoing enquiry where Bromwich's role was to consider ways to strengthen the laws regarding the liability of corporate executives.

References

Australian Senior Counsel
Australian prosecutors
Living people
Year of birth missing (living people)
University of Sydney alumni
Macquarie University alumni
Directors of Public Prosecutions of Australia
Judges of the Federal Court of Australia